En los tacones de Eva (English: In Eva's Heels) is a Colombian telenovela created by Elkin Opina, Fernán Rivera and Juan Carlos Troncoso and, that premiered on RCN Televisión on November 14, 2006, and concluded on May 22, 2008.

Plot 
The series revolves around of Juan Camilo Caballero (Jorge Enrique Abello), a man who for love is able to become a woman without imagining all the problems that this could cause.

Cast

Main 
 Jorge Enrique Abello as Juan Camilo / Eva María León Jaramillo Viuda de Zuloaga
 Mónica Lopera as Isabella Nieto 
 Manuela González as Lucía
 Patrick Forster-Delmas as Cristóbal
 Antonio Sanint as Santiago
 Frank Ramírez as Jesús
 Julio Echeverry as Fernando
 Jacques Toukhmanian as Alexis 
 Adriana Ricardo as Marcela
 Alejandra Azcárate as Laura
 Vicky Hernández as Lucrecía de Nieto
 Jairo Camargo as Ricardo
 Carlos Barbosa as Olimpo
 Jorge Herrera as Domingo
 Sara Corrales as Angélica
 John Ceballos as Gregorio
 Gustavo Angarita as Modesto
 Ana María Kámper as Maruja

Recurring 
 Andrea Gómez as Ana
 Belky Arizala as Jackie
 Christian Ruiz as Johnatan
 Fabián Mendoza as Andrés
 Felipe Calero as Tom Stevenson
 Herbert King as Tobías
 Isabella Santo Domingo as Victoria Morales
 Joavany Álvarez as Oliver
 Julián Arango as Mario de La Espriella Lombardi
 Julio César Herrera as Nelson Betancourt
 Luis Fernando Salas as Nardo
 María Fernanda Yepes as Valentina
 Sofía Jaramillo as Cameron Cifuentes Araujo

References

External links 
 

2006 telenovelas
2006 Colombian television series debuts
2008 Colombian television series endings
RCN Televisión telenovelas
Colombian telenovelas
Spanish-language telenovelas
Television shows set in Bogotá